"Dream Me a Life" is the fortieth episode (the fifth episode of the third season) of the television revival series The Twilight Zone. In this episode, a widow and a widower in an assisted living residence share the same nightmare.

Plot
Widower Roger Leeds lives in an assisted living residence but refuses to interact with the other tenants. He is tormented by the loss of his wife and by a recurring nightmare in which a woman begs him to prevent something from coming through a door. Roger's friend Frank, a retired psychiatrist, tries to get him to open up and socialize more, with little success.

A woman named Laurel Kincaid moves in. Roger recognizes her as the woman in his nightmares, but Frank tells him she has been catatonic since her husband died ten years ago. Frank finds a restless Roger one night, and they reminisce about Roger's wife for the first time. It brings Roger to tears. After going up to bed, Roger has the nightmare. While he is struggling to get away from Laurel, she shoves him into a lit candle. He wakes up with a burn mark.

Roger confronts Laurel about the nightmares, but she is unresponsive. He talks about how much pain his wife was in when she died. Roger tells Laurel that he cannot protect her from whatever is behind the door because he could not save his own wife. That night, he has the nightmare but this time tries to keep the door closed. He abruptly intuits that Laurel is not keeping something out, but keeping something trapped in, so Roger busts the door open. Laurel's dead husband comes in and tells her she must accept his death. He says that it was he who was calling for him, not Laurel. Roger asks why, and he says "I think you know."

Roger awakens and goes down to talk to Laurel. She begins talking, apologizing for his burned hand. He invites her to breakfast. They smile at each other and go inside.

See also
Dreamscape, a similarly themed film

External links
 

1988 American television episodes
The Twilight Zone (1985 TV series season 3) episodes
Television episodes about nightmares

fr:Le Mauvais Rêve